Phyllonorycter ribefoliae is a moth of the family Gracillariidae. It is known from California and Oregon in the United States.

The larvae feed on Ribes species. They mine the leaves of their host plant. The mine has the form of a tentiform mine on the underside of the leaf.

References

External links
mothphotographersgroup

ribefoliae
Moths of North America
Moths described in 1939